Qilibi Khan (Chinese: 俟力苾可汗, (Pinyin): qílìbì kěhàn, (Wade-Giles): ch'i-li-pi k'o-han, Middle Chinese: (Guangyun) , died 647), personal name Ashina Simo (阿史那思摩), Chinese name Li Simo (李思摩), full regal title Yiminishuqilibi Khagan (乙彌泥孰俟力苾可汗), Tang noble title Prince of Huaihua (懷化王), was a member of the Eastern Tujue (Göktürk) royal house who was given the title of Khan of Eastern Tujue for several years, as a vassal of the Chinese Tang Dynasty.

Background 
After Emperor Taizong of Tang conquered Eastern Tujue in 630, he briefly settled the Eastern Tujue people within Tang borders, but after a failed assassination attempt against him by a member of the Eastern Tujue royal house, Ashina Jiesheshuai in 639, he changed his mind and decided to resettle the Eastern Tujue people between the Great Wall and the Gobi Desert, to serve as a buffer between Tang and Xueyantuo.  He created Ashina Simo, a member of Eastern Tujue's royal house as well, as Yiminishuqilibi Khan (or Qilibi Khan for short), and Ashina Simo served as the khan of the recreated Eastern Tujue khanate for several years.  However, in 644, faced with constant pressure from Xueyantuo, Ashina Simo's people abandoned him and fled south back to Tang territory.  Ashina Simo himself also returned to Tang and served as a Tang general until his death, probably in 645.

During the reigns of Ashina Duojishi, Ashina Silifu, and Ashina Duobi 

He was born in 583. What is known is that he was of the same royal Ashina clan as the khans of Tujue, a grandson of Taspar Qaghan His father Tugruq Shad (咄六設) was a son of Taspar, which would make him to senior to Shibi Khagan, Chuluo Khagan and Illig Khagan who were brothers to each other and who successively served as khans. Despite Ashina Simo's royal lineage, it was said that on account of his appearance, which appeared more Sogdian than Tujue, Ashina Duojishi and Ashina Chuluo both suspected him of being born out of an adulterous relationship, and therefore did not entrust him with great authorities. Throughout their reigns, he thus only carried the title of Jiabi Tegin (夾畢特勒), and could not be a general. According to Suzuki Kosetsu, it was a political situation created by Issik Khagan's descendants, who did not want succession crisis. In 624, during a dispute that Eastern Tujue had with China's Tang Dynasty, which was then a vassal of Eastern Tujue, as part of the negotiations, Ashina Duobi sent Ashina Simo to meet with Emperor Gaozu of Tang, and Emperor Gaozu honored Ashina Simo with the title of Prince of Heshun.

Late in Ashina Duobi's reign, with Tang strengthening and Eastern Tujue weakening due to internal problems, many of Eastern Tujue tribes surrendered to Tang, and while apparently Tang made overtures to Ashina Simo, Ashina Simo remained faithful to Ashina Duobi.  His faithfulness to Ashina Duobi continued even after Emperor Gaozu's son Emperor Taizong launched a major attack commanded by the general Li Jing in 629—such that when Tang forces captured Ashina Duobi in 630, Ashina Simo remained with him and was captured with him.  Emperor Taizong was impressed with Ashina Simo's faithfulness and made him a general and a commandant, in command of the people formerly directly under Ashina Duobi.  He also created Ashina Simo the Prince of Huaihua in 23 July 630.

As khagan 
Emperor Taizong initially settled the Eastern Tujue people within Tang borders, but after a failed assassination attempt against him by Ashina Duojishi's son Ashina Jiesheshuai in 639, he changed his mind.  On August 13, 639, he created Ashina Simo (who was by this point also given the imperial clan surname Li and therefore also known as Li Simo) as the Yiminishuqilibi Khan (or Qilibi Khan for short) and ordered the settled Tujue people to follow Ashina Simo north of the Yellow River to settle between the Great Wall and the Gobi Desert. The Tujue people, fearful of Xueyantuo — a former Eastern Tujue vassal that had become powerful and taken over Eastern Tujue's former territory — initially refused. Emperor Taizong thereafter issued an edict to Xueyantuo's Zhenzhu Khan, Yi'nan, delivered by his official Guo Siben (郭嗣本), ordering Xueyantuo not to attack the newly reestablished Eastern Tujue.  Yi'nan, while displeased at the development, initially agreed.  Emperor Taizong then carried out a formal creation ceremony for Ashina Simo, presided by the great general Li Xiaogong, and also held an imperial feast in Ashina Simo's honor. He created the Eastern Tujue princes Ashina Zhong (阿史那忠) and Ashina Nishu (阿史那泥熟) as Ashina Simo's assistants.

In spring 641, Ashina Simo's people finally crossed the Yellow River, and he established his headquarters at Dingxiang (定襄, in modern Hohhot, Inner Mongolia).  He was said to have 30,000 households, 40,000 troops, and 90,000 warhorses. He submitted a petition to Emperor Taizong, stating:

Emperor Taizong agreed.  In winter 641, indeed, with Yi'nan anticipating that Emperor Taizong would soon be offering sacrifices to heaven and earth at Mount Tai and would take his soldiers with him, he believed that he could destroy Ashina Simo quickly.  He therefore had his son Dadu (大度) to head Xueyantuo troops, along with conscripted troops from vassal tribes Tongluo (同羅), Pugu (僕骨), Huige, Mohe, and Xi (霫), launch a major attack on Eastern Tujue.  Ashina Simo could not resist the attack, and withdrew within the Great Wall to Shuo Prefecture (朔州, roughly modern Shuozhou, Shanxi) and sought emergency aid.  Emperor Taizong sent the generals Zhang Jian, Li Shiji, Li Daliang, Zhang Shigui (張士貴), and Li Xiyu (李襲譽), to attack Xueyantuo to assist Ashina Simo, with Li Shiji in overall command.  Around the new year 642, Li Shiji dealt a major defeat to Dadu, who fled after heavy casualties.  Emperor Taizong, while sending an emissary to rebuke Yi'nan, did not take further actions against Xueyantuo at this point.  It was said that Yi'nan continued to be unhappy with Eastern Tujue's existence, and continued to harass Eastern Tujue.  (Yi'nan, however, tried to maintain peaceful relations with Tang, and at one point was engaged to marry Emperor Taizong's daughter Princess Xinxing, but Emperor Taizong regretted the marriage agreement and broke it in 643 under the pretense that Yi'nan's offer of bride price (with livestock) was not paid for on time.)  When Emperor Taizong sent further emissaries to order Yi'nan from attacking Eastern Tujue, Yi'nan's response was:

Around the new year 645, Ashina Simo's people, apparently under the Xueyantuo pressure, collapsed and abandoned Ashina Simo.  (At this time, Emperor Taizong was deep in his preparation to attack Goguryeo, and therefore, if Xueyantuo had attacked, might not have been able to protect Eastern Tujue.)  They crossed the Yellow River south, seeking to be settled among Sheng (勝州, also in modern Hohhot, but south of the Yellow River) and Xia (夏州, roughly modern Yulin, Shaanxi) Prefectures.  Despite officials' opposition, Emperor Taizong agreed, and did so.  Ashina Simo, with his reconstituted state in shambles, also returned to China, and was again made a Tang general, ending Tang's attempt to recreate Eastern Tujue as a vassal.

After return to Tang 
Emperor Taizong soon launched a major attack on Goguryeo, and Ashina Simo followed Emperor Taizong on the campaign. During siege of Baekam (백암성), Ashina Simo was injured by an arrow, and it was said that Emperor Taizong personally sucked the pus out of his wound, which greatly inspired the soldiers. Taizong himself also tended to the injury of another Turkic General who was wounded during the war against Goguryeo, Qibi Heli.  It was said that after Ashina Simo returned to the Tang capital Chang'an (implying that this is after the end of the campaign in fall 645), he died.  He was buried with great honors near the tomb of Emperor Taizong's wife Empress Zhangsun, where Emperor Taizong would eventually be buried himself as well.

Physical Appearance
The Old Book of Tang described Ashina Simo's appearance as resembling Sogdians more than Göktürks. Simo's Sogdian-like appearance aroused suspicion towards him from Khagans Shibi and Chuluo and prevented Simo from becoming Shad.

Simo was a relative of Xieli. Because his face was like that of the ‘barbarian (huren 胡人)’ and not like that of the Tujue, Shibi [Khagan] and Chuluo [Khagan] were doubtful of his being one of the Ashina. Thus although he always held the title of Jiabi Teqin [夾畢特勤; ms. 夾畢特勒] during Chuluo and Xieli’s time, he could not become a shad (she 設) in command of the army till the end.

In popular culture 
 Portrayed by Im Byung-ki in 2006-2007 SBS TV series Yeon Gaesomun.
 Portrayed by Yuan Hong in the 2012 Hunan TV series Secret History of Princess Taiping.
 Portrayed by Leo Wu as Ashile sun in 2021 Chinese historical drama [The long ballad] (TV series)

See also 
 Emperor Taizong's campaign against Eastern Tujue
 Turks in the Tang military

Notes

References

Sources 

 Old Book of Tang, vol. 194, part 1.
 New Book of Tang, vol. 215, part 1.
 Zizhi Tongjian, vols. 191, 193, 195, 196, 197.

Göktürk khagans
Tang dynasty generals at war against Goguryeo
Tang dynasty generals at war against the Göktürks
Tang dynasty nonimperial princes
645 deaths
Tang dynasty generals at war against Xueyantuo
Ashina house of the Turkic Empire
7th-century Turkic people
Year of birth unknown
583 births
Monarchs taken prisoner in wartime